Heart of Dragon, (Chinese: 龍的心) released in the United Kingdom as Heart of the Dragon, is a 1985 Hong Kong action drama film directed by Sammo Hung, who also starred in the lead role. The film co-stars Jackie Chan, Emily Chu and Mang Hoi. Yuen Biao served as the action director for the film.

It is also known by the titles as The First Mission and Powerman III.

Background
The film is unusual in that although featuring Sammo Hung and Lam Ching-ying, two actors famed for their kung fu abilities, neither actually perform any martial arts. Golden Harvest had wanted Hung to perform fight scenes in the film, but he refused, rationalising "My character was mentally retarded, mentally disabled, so how can you ask me to fall down and suddenly become well again? And fight? They knew my fighting skills and wanted me to be part of the action but I thought that would have completely destroyed the tone of the film, the principles behind the film."

The action is left to Chan and his fellow CID officers, Mang Hoi, Yuen Wah, Peter Chan and Corey Yuen. Despite the relative lack of action scenes, the film was nominated for the Best Action Choreography award at the 5th Hong Kong Film Awards in 1986. It was beaten by Chan's Police Story.

The bad guys are led by James Tien and include Dick Wei, Chung Fat, Phillip Ko and Kao Sau-leung. The film also features a small role for Wu Ma as a restaurant owner and, like My Lucky Stars, Sammo Hung's real life brother makes a cameo appearance as a policeman (who walks into Inspector Wong's office without knocking).

Cast and roles
 Jackie Chan as Ted / Tat Fung (doubled by Yuen Biao)
 Sammo Hung as Danny / Dodo Fung
 Emily Chu as Jenny
 Mang Hoi as Yan
 Lam Ching-ying as SWAT Team Commander
 Peter Chan as SWAT Team Member
 Chin Kar-lok as Lok
 Yuen Wah as SWAT Team Member
 Corey Yuen as SWAT Team Member
 Melvin Wong as Inspector Wong
 Dennis Chan as Waiter
 Anthony Chan as Private Teacher
 Chung Fat as Moose / Cho Yee-fat / Fa
 James Tien as Mr. Kim
 Dick Wei as Kim's Man
 Phillip Ko as Kim's Man
 Shan Tai as Kim's Man
 Kao Sau-leung as Kim's Man
 Kong Chow as Kim's Man
 Billy Ching as Kim's Man
 Tai San as Kim's Man
 Wu Ma as Cafe Owner
 Soh Hang-suen as Cafe Owner's wife
 Lam Ying-fat as Edmond Pang Kwok-wah
 Lee Ka-ho – Heung Chi-ming
 Tze Man-ha – Mrs. Chee / Grandma
 Tai Bo as Kenny
 Lee Hoi-sang as Thug at restaurant
 Fung Hak-on as Thug at restaurant
 Chiu Chi-ling as Thug at restaurant

Versions
As this was intended as a dramatic film, showing a different side of Hung's acting abilities, it contains comparatively few action scenes. Two additional fight scenes were filmed, but these were cut from both the domestic Hong Kong print and the international print of the film. Due to the demands of certain markets, these scenes were included in some prints of the film, notably the Japanese release. They are included as additional features on the US, UK and Australian DVD releases of the film.

Box office
This film grossed HK$20.3 million at the Hong Kong box office. Although a commercial success, it was considerably low compared to the other Jackie Chan action blockbusters of the 80s.

Awards and nominations

See also

 Jackie Chan filmography
 List of Hong Kong films

References

External links

 

1985 films
1980s action thriller films
1980s action drama films
1985 martial arts films
1980s Cantonese-language films
Films directed by Sammo Hung
Golden Harvest films
Hong Kong action thriller films
Hong Kong drama films
Hong Kong martial arts films
Police detective films
Films about intellectual disability
Films set in Hong Kong
Films shot in Hong Kong
1985 drama films
1980s Hong Kong films